Camp Sharpe was a World War II military installation located on the Gettysburg Battlefield that trained soldiers for psychological operations (e.g., morale operations) in the European Theater of Operations (see Operation Cornflakes & Frontpost newspaper).

History
Adjacent to Civilian Conservation Corps (CCC) camp NP-2 in McMillan Woods, Camp Sharpe used camp CCC NP-1 and was located "in a muddy hollow at the bottom of a slanting road". A USO facility for Camp Sharpe soldiers was located at the former Hill house on Chambersburg Street in nearby Gettysburg, Pennsylvania.

After Camp Sharpe closed in 1944, USO operations were moved sometime around January 1945 to "the recreation center for the guards" of the Gettysburg POW camp.  The former camp was used for migrant workers in the summer of 1945.

Further reading
 Florian Traussnig: Die Psychokrieger aus Camp Sharpe: Österreicher als Kampfpropagandisten der US-Armee im Zweiten Weltkrieg, Böhlau 2020,

References

Closed training facilities of the United States Army
Civilian Conservation Corps in Pennsylvania
Civilian Conservation Corps camps